Nowon C is a constituency of the National Assembly of South Korea. The constituency consists of part of Nowon District, Seoul. As of 2018, 152,393 eligible voters were registered in the constituency.

List of members of the National Assembly

Election results

2018 (by-election)

2016

2013 (by-election)

2012

2008

2004

References 

Constituencies of the National Assembly (South Korea)